The Fijian national basketball team is the team that represents Fiji in international basketball, administered by the Fiji Amateur Basketball Federation. It is a member of FIBA Oceania.

The men's team are led by New Zealand NBL player Marques Whippy and his brothers Leonard and Waymann. Their father, Paul Whippy, has previously coached the men's team.

In 2007, the men's team won the gold medal at the South Pacific Games.

Competitive performances

FIBA Oceania Championship
Never participated

Oceania Basketball Tournament

1981 : 4th
1985 : 
1989 : 4th
1993 : 4th
1997 : 4th
2001 : 
2005 : 3rd
2009-2013 : ?

Commonwealth Games

Never participated

Pacific Games

1963 : 6th
1966 : ?
1969 : 7th
1971-1979 : ?
1983 : 4th
1987 : 
1991 : 4th
1995 : 
1999 : 4th
2003 : 4th
2007 : 
2011 : 4th
2015 : 
2019 :

Pacific Mini Games

1997 : ?
2007 : 
2017 : To be determined

Current team
As of 15 July 2017:  (Silver medal squad)

Head coach position
 Paul Whippy - 2011
 Saula Koroi - 2013

Past teams
Scroll down to see more.
2007 Men (Gold Medal Pacific Games)
Adrian Bossley
Baravi Thaman
Frank Saketa
Ioane Naivalurua
Isikeli Mara
Jale Vunisa
Kolinio Matalau	
Laisiasa Puamau
Leonard Whippy
Marques Whippy
Peniasi Sokosoko
Sakiusa Rokodi

Paul Whippy (Head Coach)

Kit

Manufacturer
2015: BLK

See also
 Fiji national under-19 basketball team
 Fiji women's national basketball team

References

External links
Official website
Fiji Basketball at Australiabasket.com

Videos
 Pacific Games 2015 D5 BBM GUAM vs FIJI Youtube.com video

 
Men's national basketball teams
1979 establishments in Fiji